Hinckley is a village in Squaw Grove Township, DeKalb County, Illinois, United States. The population was 2006 at the 2020 census, a slight decline from 2,070 at the 2010 census.

History

In the 1830s, a Mr. Hollenbeck, who lived near Ottawa, Illinois, was traveling the then-unsettled territory. He found a grove of trees west of the present-day Hinckley and named it Squaw Grove, after the Native American women who were tending camp.

In the spring of 1835, John Sebree built a log house. The following year, more families came to the area and a small town was started at the west edge of what is now Hinckley, which was named Squaw Grove.

Hinckley was conceived in the 1870s as the brainchild of Francis Hinckley, president of the Chicago and Iowa Railroad. The rail line was placed one-half mile east of the Village of Squaw Grove, which was then named Hinckley.

The first store came to Hinckley in 1872. By 1876, Hinckley had twenty businesses.

The Methodist Church began in 1835, and St. Paul's Church came in 1885. A volunteer fire brigade was organized in 1886.

In 1889, a tornado destroyed most of the village.

On January 7, 1927, the Harlem Globetrotters played their first road game in Hinckley.

Education 
Hinckley is a part of the Hinckley-Big Rock Community Unit School District 429, which operates three schools:

Hinckley-Big Rock Elementary School is located on the west side of Hinckley on US HWY 30.
Hinckley-Big Rock Middle School is located in the center of Big Rock on US HWY 30.
Hinckley-Big Rock High School is located on the east side of Hinckley on US HWY 30.

Geography
Hinckley is located at  (41.771389, -88.640526).

Demographics
As of the 2020 census there were 2,006 people, 878 households, and 556 families residing in the village. The racial makeup of the village was 89.38% White, 0.55% African American, 0.10% Native American, 0.95% Asian, 0.10% Pacific Islander, 1.89% from other races, and 7.03% from two or more races. Hispanic or Latino of any race were 8.18% of the population.

There were 878 households, out of which 58.09% had children under the age of 18 living with them, 47.61% were married couples living together, 12.30% had a female householder with no husband present, and 36.67% were non-families. 28.47% of all households were made up of individuals, and 8.20% had someone living alone who was 65 years of age or older. The average household size was 3.15 and the average family size was 2.49.

The village's age distribution consisted of 23.9% under the age of 18, 15.4% from 18 to 24, 20.5% from 25 to 44, 26.5% from 45 to 64, and 13.6% who were 65 years of age or older. The median age was 37.1 years. For every 100 females, there were 102.4 males. For every 100 females age 18 and over, there were 108.4 males.

The median income for a household in the village was $70,278, and the median income for a family was $79,667. Males had a median income of $54,028 versus $35,417 for females. The per capita income for the village was $33,663. About 4.9% of families and 8.9% of the population were below the poverty line, including 5.4% of those under age 18 and 5.7% of those age 65 or over.

Popular culture 
In 1981, Hinckley served as a stand-in for fictional North Crawford in Jonathan Demme's film adaptation of Who Am I This Time? by Kurt Vonnegut, Jr. Christopher Walken  and Susan Sarandon portray two painfully shy people who find one another through a community theater production of "A Streetcar Named Desire", in which they portray the tempestuous Stanley and Stella Kowalski.

Notes

External links
Village of Hinckley

Populated places established in 1872
Villages in DeKalb County, Illinois
Villages in Illinois
1872 establishments in Illinois